Viduthalai may refer to:

 Viduthalai (1954 film)
 Viduthalai (1986 film)
 Viduthalai (upcoming film)
 Viduthalai (newspaper), a Tamil newspaper
 Viduthalai Chiruthaigal Katchi, an Indian political party
 Viduthalai Rajendran, the General Secretary of Dravidar Viduthalai Kazhagam